Leucotaenius favanii is a species of tropical air-breathing land snail, a terrestrial pulmonate gastropod mollusk in the family Acavidae.

Distribution 
This species occurs in Madagascar.

References

Acavidae